The Policeman's Lineage is a 2022  South Korean crime drama film, directed by Lee Kyoo-man and starring Cho Jin-woong and Choi Woo-shik. The film, based on Japanese novel Blood of the Policeman by Joh Sasaki, is about two cops with different methods forming a team to investigate a case that turns the police force upside down.

The film was released theatrically on January 5, 2022.

Cast
 Cho Jin-woong as Park Kang-yoon, head of the Metropolitan Investigation Unit
 Choi Woo-shik as Choi Min-jae, an undercover honest police officer
 Park Sang-hoon as young Choi Min-jae
 Park Hee-soon as Hwang In-ho
 Kwon Yul as Na Young-bin, a criminal who deals only with the top 1%
 Park Myung-hoon as Cha Dong-cheol, a criminal who survived a deal with the police
 Lee Eol 
 Jang Seo-kyung
 Lee Sung-woo as Team leader Han, (Narcotic investigation)
 Son In-yong as detective
 Lim Chul-hyung as Sun Woo-bum, A senior official at the Seoul Government Gwangsu University. He helps Kang Yoon in his near-death investigation.

Production
In July 2019 Cho Jin-woong and Choi Woo-shik were confirmed to appear in the film based on Japanese novel Blood of the Policeman by Joh Sasaki. They have worked together before in 2011 historical TV series Deep Rooted Tree. Park Myung-hoon joined the cast in January 2020. Choi Woo-shik and Park Hee-soon worked together in 2018 horror film The Witch: Part 1. The Subversion.

The film was shot in Ulsan in February 2020. Last leg of shooting was completed in Nam-gu, Ulsan City courthouse.

Release
The film was released theatrically on January 5, 2022. It made it to 'Korean Cinema Today - Panorama' section of 27th Busan International Film Festival and was screened on October 6, 2022.

Reception

Box office
The film was released on 1,184 screens on January 5, 2022. As per Korean Film Council (Kofic) integrated computer network, the film ranked at no. 2 at the Korean box office in the opening weekend with 374,432 cumulative admissions.

 it is at 13th place among all the Korean films released in the year 2022, with gross of US$5.56 million and 679,503 admissions.

Critical response
Kim Mi-hwa of Star News praising the lead cast stated, "Cho Jin-woong and Choi Woo-shik, who are diametrically opposite in terms of appearance and character, brings joy to the viewers." She also praised the performances of supporting cast of Park Hee-soon, Kwon Yul, and Park Myung-hoon and wrote, "savory performances of various supporting actors breathe life into the film." Kim felt that the film "is a mix of stories of police, gangsters, and drugs familiar to Korean audiences." But she stated that "the new chemistry that comes out of them mixes with flavor like a seasoning." She criticised the sound quality, writing, "not being able to hear the lines well in some scenes even though the actors utter the lines clearly." Concluding she wondered, "[whether the film] will be able to captivate the audience with a delicious movie made with familiar ingredients."

Awards and nominations

References

External links
 
 
 
 

2022 films
2020s South Korean films
2020s Korean-language films
2022 crime drama films
South Korean crime drama films
Films postponed due to the COVID-19 pandemic
Films based on novels
Police procedural films
Films based on Japanese novels
South Korean police films